Luliang Air Base is a People's Liberation Army Air Force Base, located about 5 kilometers southwest of Luliang in Yunnan Province, China.

History
During World War II, the base was used by the United States Army Air Forces Fourteenth Air Force as part of the China Defensive Campaign (1942–1945).  The airfield was the primary home of the 23d Fighter Group (Flying Tigers), and its command and control organization, the 68th Composite Wing beginning in September 1944 until the end of the war in 1945.   Secondary USAAF units assigned to the base were P-38 Lightning reconnaissance aircraft that flew photo-recon missions over Japanese-held territory; and C-47 Skytrain transports which moved personnel and materiel in and out of the base, along with evacuating casualties to rear areas.   The Americans closed their facilities at Luliang after the war ended in October 1945.

See also

List of People's Liberation Army Air Force airbases

References

 Maurer, Maurer. Air Force Combat Units Of World War II. Maxwell Air Force Base, Alabama: Office of Air Force History, 1983. 
 Airfields & Seaplane Anchorages China
 USFHRA Document Search – Luliang

External links

Chinese Air Force bases
Airfields of the United States Army Air Forces in China
Airports in Yunnan
Transport in Qujing